The , also known as the Kangla Gate, is the western entrance gate to the Kangla Fort in Imphal West district of .

Etymology 
In Meitei language (officially called Manipuri language), "Sanathong" literally means "the golden door", in which "sanā" means gold and "thong" means door.

Developments

LED display board 
During June 2019, Nongthombam Biren Singh, the Chief Minister of Manipur, launched an LED display board at the Kangla Western Gate. Operated by the "Leibak Information Technology Pvt Ltd, Khurai Thoidingjam Leikai", the LED board displays advertisements and information about the Kangla and other news.

Statue of King Nara Singh 

On 15 June 2022, the Government of Manipur, led by Chief Minister Nongthombam Biren Singh, unveiled the bronze statue of Meidingu Nara Singh, built at the Kangla western entrance gate in Imphal.

Replicas 
During June 2017, the Indira Gandhi Rashtriya Manav Sangrahalaya (IGRMS) of Bhopal built a replica of the Kangla Gate. To revitalise the vanishing but valuable cultural traditions, the IGRMS museum added the "Kangla Gate" in the entrance gate of the Open-air Exhibition Tribal Habitat of the museum. The grand Kangla Gate in IGRMS was crafted by a group of seven traditional artisans from Manipur led by Ibomcha Meitei.
According to "The Free Press Journal", the number of traditional artisans was fifteen.

Exhibition 
During October 2021, a model of the Kangla Sanathong (Royal Kangla Gate) was exhibited in the 72nd online exhibition series of the Indira Gandhi Rashtriya Manav Sangrahalaya (IGRMS). Kept in the Tribal Habitat Open Air Exhibition of the IGRMS museum, it was displayed online with the informative descriptions including photographs and videos.

Flag off events

Night Plaza – Imphal Evenings 
During October 2017, at the western Kangla Gate, Nongthombam Biren Singh, the Chief Minister of Manipur, opened the first evening of "Imphal Evenings", a night plaza in Imphal.

Seven-nation tour 
In August 2019, in the Western Kangla Gate, Karam Shyam, the Consumer Affairs Food And Public Distribution Minister of the Government of Manipur, flagged off the international cycling trek of Ji Ingobi Chongtham, a 21 year old cyclist of Manipur, for his 220-day seven-nation tour of different South Asian countries, including Myanmar, Thailand, Malaysia, Cambodia, Laos, Vietnam and Singapore.

E-Rickshaw roadshow 
On 19 June 2022, Nongthombam Biren Singh, the Chief Minister of Manipur, flagged off an E-Rickshaw roadshow at Western Gate of Kangla in Imphal.

Relief Assistance & Disaster Response Team 
On 27 June 2022, at the Kangla gate, Nongthombam Biren Singh, the Chief Minister of Manipur, flagged off the "Relief Assistance & Disaster Response Team" for the flood-affected people of Assam. Along with the relief materials consisting of 135 quintals of rice, 102 bags of dal, 120 bags of salt, 120 boxes of mustard oil, 40 personnels of State Disaster Response Force (SDRF) were also sent for rescue operations.

Social and religious functions

Interfaith prayer event 
On 7 June 2021, at the Western Kangla Gate, an interfaith prayer event was organised under the supervision of Nongthombam Biren Singh, the Chief Minister of Manipur, to attain divine healings and protections from COVID-19 in Manipur.
The prayer event was participated by the representatives from Sanamahism (Lainingthou Sanamahi Temple Board), Christianity (Archbishop Most Rev. Dominic Lumon, All Manipur Christian Organisation), Hinduism (priests from Shree Shree Govindajee Temple Board), Islam (Jamiat-Ul-Ulema), Tingkao Ragwang Chapriak, Sikhism (Giani Gurudwara Prabandhak Committee), Jainism (Shree Digambar Jain Samaj) and Kabui religion (Kabui Poupei Chapriak Fom).

Yaoshang torch lit up events 

During the heights of the COVID-19 pandemic in March 2022, the Department of Archaeology of the Government of Manipur allowed the opening of all the three entrance gates of the Kangla, including the Kangla western gate. All the three grand doors were opened because of a large number of NGOs and clubs visiting the Kangla Fort to lit torches for the Yaoshang festival. Five representative members of each association and organization were allowed to enter either of the three gates on 18 and 19 March 2022, from 7 am to 4 pm.

See also 
 Statue of Meidingu Nara Singh

Notes

References

External links 

Meitei architecture
Cultural heritage of India
Landmarks in India
Meitei culture
Monuments and memorials in India
Monuments and memorials in Imphal
Monuments and memorials in Manipur
Monuments and memorials to Meitei people
Monuments and memorials to Meitei royalties
Public art in India
Tourist attractions in India